Marcos Gomes Valadares (born 23 July 1977) is a Brazilian football manager, currently in charge of Atlético Mineiro's under-20 squad.

Career
Born in São Paulo, Valadares was a Federal University of Minas Gerais alumni and started his career in 2004 as Olympic de Barbacena's fitness coach. In January of the following year, he was named manager of Belo Horizonte-based side Santa Cruz.

In 2006, after a short spell at Associação Esportiva Santa Tereza, Valadares joined América Mineiro's youth setup. In 2008 he left the club, and was appointed manager of the under-17 side of Amparense FC, but moved to Ipatinga in the following year.

In 2010, Valadares was appointed manager of Cruzeiro's under-15 team. He moved to Fluminense in 2012, being in charge of the club's under-17 and under-20 squads.

On 25 February 2015, Valadares joined Palmeiras and was named manager of the under-20s. In September, however, he returned to Cruzeiro now as under-20 manager.

Valadares left Cruzeiro in April 2017, On 6 March 2018, after a 17-day spell as Patrocinense's assistant manager, he was named Vasco da Gama's under-20 manager.

On 21 April 2019, after Alberto Valentim's dismissal, Valadares was named interim manager of the first team. His first professional match occurred three days later, a 2–1 Copa do Brasil home win against Santos.

In 2020, he took charge of Atlético Mineiro's under-20 squad.

References

External links

1977 births
Living people
Sportspeople from São Paulo
Brazilian football managers
CR Vasco da Gama managers